Ayaka Kuno (born December 8, 1987 in Nihommatsu) is a Japanese sprint canoer who competed in the late 2000s. At the 2008 Summer Olympics in Beijing, she finished sixth in the K-4 500 m event.

External links
 Sports-Reference.com profile

1987 births
Canoeists at the 2008 Summer Olympics
Japanese female canoeists
Living people
Olympic canoeists of Japan
Asian Games medalists in canoeing
Canoeists at the 2010 Asian Games
Medalists at the 2010 Asian Games
Asian Games bronze medalists for Japan